Serving in Silence: The Margarethe Cammermeyer Story is a 1995 American television film that aired on NBC and stars Glenn Close and Judy Davis.

Plot
The film recounts the events in the life of Colonel Margarethe Cammermeyer which led to her retirement from the Washington National Guard under the U.S. military's gay exclusion policy.

Cast

Awards and nominations

Artios Award (1995)
 Won, "Best Casting for TV Movie of the Week" - Valorie Massalas

Emmy Awards (1995)
 Won, "Outstanding Writing for a Miniseries or a Special" - Alison Cross
 Won, "Outstanding Lead Actress in a Miniseries or a Movie" - Glenn Close
 Won, "Outstanding Supporting Actress in a Miniseries or a Special" - Judy Davis
Nominated, "Outstanding Directing for a Miniseries or a Special" - Jeff Bleckner
Nominated, "Outstanding Editing for a Miniseries or a Special - Single Camera Production" - Geoffrey Rowland
Nominated, "Outstanding Made for Television Movie" - Barbra Streisand, Glenn Close, Craig Zadan, Neil Meron, Cis Corman, Richard Heus

GLAAD Media Awards (1996)
 Won, "Outstanding TV Movie"

Golden Globe Awards (1996) 
Nominated, "Best Mini-Series or Motion Picture Made for TV"
Nominated, "Best Actress in a Mini-Series or Motion Picture Made for Television" - Glenn Close
Nominated, "Best Supporting Actress in a Series, Mini-Series or Motion Picture Made for Television" - Judy Davis

Peabody Awards (1996)
 Won

Screen Actors Guild Awards (1996)
Nominated, "Outstanding Performance by a Female Actor in a TV Movie or Miniseries" - Glenn Close

Writers Guild of America Award (1996)
Nominated, "Original Long Form" - Alison Cross

References

External links
 
 

1995 television films
1995 films
American LGBT-related television films
Barwood Films films
Films directed by Jeff Bleckner
Lesbian-related films
Lesbian-related television shows
Biographical films about LGBT people
NBC network original films
Peabody Award-winning broadcasts
1990s American films